Terence Peter "Terry" Smith (born 10 September 1951) is an English former footballer who played in the Football League for Stoke City and Shrewsbury Town.

Career
Smith was born in Cheltenham and joined Stoke City's youth team as an apprentice. He played three matches during the 1970–71 season scoring once away at Chelsea. He played once the following season and had a short spell on loan at Shrewsbury Town in 1972. At the end of the season he was released and he emigrated to Australia and played for Western Suburbs, St George Budapest and Hakoah Eastern Suburbs.

Career statistics

References

English footballers
Stoke City F.C. players
Shrewsbury Town F.C. players
English Football League players
National Soccer League (Australia) players
1951 births
Living people
Sportspeople from Cheltenham
English expatriate footballers
Expatriate soccer players in Australia
Association football forwards